Sunder Nagar is a small area lying within the suburban region of Malad–Goregaon in Mumbai, India. It lies in west of the arterial Swami Vivekanand Road and is mostly a residential neighbourhood. It was built up in the 1970s during the city's population and construction boom. The name Sunder Nagar means "beautiful place" in Hindi. There was a community called "Vijaykar Wadi" before 1970 and its name was changed to "Sunder Nagar". "Wadi" means group of trees, there were many "Mango" and "Chikoo" trees in the area, still some can be seen in the park maintained by "The Sunder Nagar Welfare Association".

The area is also known for having a number of educational institutes. The schools contained in this area include Infant Jesus School, Umedbhai Patel English School along with international schools such as DH Khetan International School and Mainadevi Bajaj International School. Colleges contained in this area include Dalmia College and Saraf College. The area also encompasses a few parks to the south such as Jogger's Park and BMC Park. The most visited area in this place is the Sunder Nagar Garden. It has all the street food you crave for along with kids play area. It also has a playground adjacent to it, with facilities that allow playing cricket, football, badminton as well as athletics.

The residents are mostly Gujaratis - Hindus as well as Muslims. A small Sikh community is centred on a small Gurudwara. There is a huge upper middle class and upper class Gujarati, Marwari community in and around Sunder Nagar, consisting mainly of businessmen and businesswomen. About 75% of the population of Sunder Nagar is Hindu, the rest mainly Muslim. There are several bakeries and Dairy shops. The most popular bakeries are Hangout and Chocoholix. There is also a busy Café Coffee Day within the locality, adding to the cosmopolitan lifestyle of the residents and college/highschool students that frequent the coffee shop. Sunder Nagar has buildings named by English alphabet and are merely in alphabetical order. The most populated building is P Unit while the least populated is M unit. New projects have come in this area to cater to the upmarket lifestyle of Sundar Nagar's residents, which include Saptaratna Towers and Asmita Sand Dunes. Main road in this area is Sundarnagar Road which is directly perpendicular to SV Road through the Vadapav seller port Jumboking.

Sunder Nagar is an area near to Chincholi Bunder and Bangur Nagar. The place is a very serene area with very low traffic after 9 pm. Sunder Nagar is a place could be in around our surrounding (in simple words could be reached) in about 6 min by drive from both its near railway stations- Malad and Goregaon. Sunder Nagar has many Medical, Departmental and foodstalls like Rajasthan Medical, Swastik Supermarket, Popular Stores, Mafco Farmhouse, Ankur Dairy Shop and Jumboking. It is also hardly a 7 min drive from Inorbit Mall, 10 min drive from Oberoi Mall and 15 min drive from Infinity Mall, given that you live near the garden. This makes Sunder Nagar a very well-connected area and one of the premium locations of Malad West and Goregaon West.

A walking track here is often done by all-aged people and is approximately 600 metres long which can be walked in about 7 minutes, with having sights of Garden, Ground, Building as well as Umedhbhai and Radhakrishnan School.

References

Neighbourhoods in Mumbai